Kagare (Kwagere) is a Kainji language of Nigeria belonging to the Kamuku language complex. There is partial intelligibility with Cinda, Regi and Səgəmuk (Zubazuba). Kagare is reported by Blench, but is not in Ethnologue or Glottolog.

References

Kamuku languages
Languages of Nigeria